Bourbon is a French shipping company, based in Marseilles.

Bourbon operates in the field of surface and submarine maritime services, on oil, gas and wind farms. The company has 6,820 employees, and the group is present in more than 30 countries.

Business 
Bourbon's activity evolves around 4 businesses:

 Bourbon Marine & Logistics: support services for the exploration, development and production of oil and gas fields, in continental and deep offshore: offshore anchoring, towing and positioning; supply and transport of offshore equipment; offshore terminal & FPSO support; integrated logistics services; assistance, salvage and depollution.
 Bourbon Mobility: personnel transport for platforms at sea, using speedboats, which offers the oil industry an alternative to the helicopter.
 Bourbon Subsea Services: 3 main service lines: engineering, supervision and management of subsea operations; support for the development of oil and gas fields; Inspection, Maintenance and Repair (IMR) of offshore structures at depths of up to 4,000 meters.
 Bourbon Wind: Pre-studies, transport and installation services, field maintenance, repair of floats and personnel transport for floating wind farms

Story

1948-1988: sugar cane, the group's first engine 
In 1948, the Bourbon Group was born from the merger of several family companies on the island of Reunion, with a view to reviving the local sugar industry, under the name of Sucreries de Bourbon. It was then directed by Émile Hugot. Its markets are sugar, but also rum, destined for metropolitan France.

1989-1999: diversification and IPO 
In 1989, the group diversified, first in La Réunion, into industrial fishing (1989), mass distribution (1991) and dairy products (1992).

Subsequently, the large food distribution subsidiary established itself in the Indian Ocean and in Vietnam with the Score supermarkets and the Jumbo Score hypermarkets via its Vindémia subsidiary, which was sold in 2005 to the Casino Group (sale that became final in 2007) .

Then, the group continued its diversification in mainland France with the acquisition of 50% of Compagnie Chambon (Marseilles) in 1991. It thus took control of the company Surf. The group then expanded into the offshore oil and gas maritime services sector, for which it acquired the companies Les Abeilles (towage) and Setaf-Saget (solid bulk transport) in 1996. In 1998, the Bourbon Group went public, on the Second Market of the Paris Stock Exchange

2000-2006: refocusing on maritime services 
The group separated from its historical activities between 2001 and 2002 and accelerated its refocusing on maritime services by positioning itself with, from 2003, on deep offshore maritime services in Brazil and West Africa and in 2004 on subsea operations by acquiring the company Gaia Enterprise, which a year later became Bourbon Offshore Gaia.

In October 2003, Bourbon entered the capital of Naïade Resorts, a group managing the hotels Les Villas du Lagon, Les Villas du Récif and Les Créoles. In August 2007, the group resold its shares to shareholders of the hotel group.

In May 2005, the group bought out CBo Territoria in the area of ​​property development. It is a question of exploiting the land heritage inherited by the group's chairman and managing director, Jacques de Chateauvieux. In 2013, he sold his shares in CBo Territoria to the managers of the property company.

In 2005, the Bourbon Group became BOURBON. The head office, first based in La Réunion, in Sainte-Marie, was transferred to Paris in June 2005. Bourbon entered the SBF 120 index of the Paris Stock Exchange in 2006

2007-2016: offshore oil and gas marine services 
Bourbon sold the port towage business in 2007 and positioned itself in the Inspection, Maintenance and Repair (IMR) market for offshore oil fields. In 2008, Bourbon acquired DNT Offshore, an Italian company specializing in underwater robot operations. The group then separated from its "ancillary" activities (sweets, bulk transport, etc.) to refocus on offshore maritime services. At the end of 2014, the oil sector was marked by the sudden drop in the price of a barrel of oil, the start of a deep crisis for the entire offshore market.

2017-2020: fall and transformation 
Then, in December 2017, it was transferred from Paris to Marseilles (with ratification on May 30, 2018).

Financial restructuring and change in shareholding 
The offshore market crisis continued and led Bourbon to sign a debt restructuring agreement with its creditor banks in mid-2017. Without a positive sign of market recovery, the group announced in mid-March 2018 a net loss, group share, of 576.3 million euros for 2017. It reopened these negotiations on April 20, 2018: in agreement with its shareholders, it announced suspended rent payments and debt servicing pending ongoing negotiations with lessors and creditors, in order to focus funds on "operational priorities and market recovery", which "should encourage parties to reach an agreement as soon as possible". In view of the financial difficulties, its shareholders authorize it to postpone for one year an interest payment of approximately 3.9 million euros normally due in April 2018.

In July 2019, heavily indebted, the group requested the opening of receivership proceedings for its 2 holding companies Bourbon Corporation and Bourbon Maritime. Which is accepted on August 7. The title of the company collapses on the stock market. On November 8, 2019, the listing of the security is suspended. The court's decision on the takeover of the group comes on December 23, 2019 when only one official offer from the creditor banks has been filed.

On January 10, 2020, Société Phocéenne de Participation (SPP), owned by a group of French banks uniting the creditors representing 75% of the group's debt, acquires 100% of the assets of Bourbon Corporation (including the Bourbon brands) and becomes the group's new majority shareholder. The finalization of the financial restructuring in December 2020 brought new shareholders into the capital of the SPP: ICBCL and Standard Chartered Bank with approximately 18% and 10% of the capital respectively [ref. necessary].

The January 2020 disposal causes a "total loss" for the former shareholders. In April 2020, the former holding company (Bourbon Corporation), formerly majority-owned by Jaccar Holdings (which owned 52.8% of the capital on July 14, 2019), was placed in compulsory liquidation. The shares are delisted on June 22, 2020.

In October 2020, Bourbon sold Les Abeilles to the Econocom group.

Bourbon Maritime is coming out of receivership in December 2020 with a sharp reduction in its debt.

Transformation plan 
Faced with the deepest crisis that the oil industry has gone through since the 1990s, Bourbon announced in February 2018 a strategic action plan "#Bourboninmotion". This plan reorganizes the group's activities into three separate subsidiaries: Bourbon Marine & Logistics, Bourbon Subsea Services and Bourbon Mobility.

References

External links

 Bourbon
 Bourbon 

Transport companies of France